Stenanthemum humile is a species of flowering plant in the family Rhamnaceae and is endemic to the southwest of Western Australia. It is a low, erect perennial herb or shrub with white, woolly-hairy young stems, linear to narrowly elliptic leaves and densely, woolly-hairy heads of tube-shaped flowers.

Description
The edges of the leaves are rolled under.

Taxonomy and naming
Stenanthemum humile was first formally described in 1863 by George Bentham in Flora Australiensis from specimens collected by James Drummond between the Moore and Murchison Rivers. The specific epithet (humile) means "low" or "small".

Distribution and habitat
This species grows in low heath, shrubland or woodland on sand, mainly between Three Springs and Regans Ford with an outlier near Perth, in the Avon Wheatbelt, Geraldton Sandplains, Jarrah Forest and Swan Coastal Plain bioregions of south-western Western Australia.

Conservation status
Stenanthemum humile is listed as "not threatened" by the Government of Western Australia Department of Biodiversity, Conservation and Attractions.

References

humile
Rosales of Australia
Flora of Western Australia
Plants described in 1863
Taxa named by George Bentham